George Washington Hays (September 23, 1863September 15, 1927) was an American politician who served as the 24th Governor of Arkansas from 1913 to 1917.

Biography
Hays was born in Camden, Arkansas. He attended public schools in Camden and worked as a farmer, store clerk and teacher Hays studied law at Washington and Lee University in Lexington, Virginia, and opened his own law practice in Camden. He was married to Ida Virginia Yarborough and had 2 children.

Career
Hays was probate and county judge for Ouachita County, Arkansas between 1900 and 1905. Hays served as a judge with the Thirteenth Circuit Court from 1906 to 1913.

When Governor Joseph Taylor Robinson resigned in 1913 to serve in the United States Senate, a special election was held and Hays was elected governor. His administration focused on road improvement and enactment of a statewide prohibition law. The Hays administration also enacted a child labor law and completed construction of the new state capitol building. Hays won reelection in a contested election in 1914.

Hays returned to private law practice in Little Rock after his term as governor, and published several articles in national periodicals, including Scribner's.

Death
Hays died in Little Rock, Arkansas of influenza and pneumonia and is buried in Camden, Arkansas in Greenwood Cemetery.

See also

List of governors of Arkansas

References

External links
 Encyclopedia of Arkansas History & Culture
 Old Statehouse Museum
 National Governors Association

Democratic Party governors of Arkansas
1863 births
1927 deaths
County judges in Arkansas
People from Camden, Arkansas
Washington and Lee University School of Law alumni
Deaths from influenza
Infectious disease deaths in Arkansas
Deaths from pneumonia in Arkansas
African-American men in politics